Lucerna may refer to:
Lucerna, Ocotepeque, a municipality in Honduras
 Lucerne, a city in Switzerland
 Lucerna (cattle)
 Lucerna: a genus of snails in the family Pleurodontidae
 Lucerna (play), a play by Alois Jirásek
 The Lantern (1925 film),, a 1925 Czech film based on Jirásek's play
 The Lantern (1938 film),, a 1938 Czech film based on Jirásek's play
 Lucerna Palace, an entertainment and shopping complex in Prague, Czech Republic
 Lucerna Music Bar, a concert club within Lucerna Palace
 Lucerna, a neighborhood in Santo Domingo, Dominican Republic.